This article provides details of international football games played by the Costa Rica national team from 2020 to present.

Overview

Results

2020

2021

2022

2023

Head to head records

Notes

References

Costa Rica national football team results
2020s in Costa Rican sport